Umm al Quşayr is a village in Al-Hasakah District, Al-Hasakah Governorate, Syria.

References 

Villages in Syria